PM Live is Raidió Teilifís Éireann's former live flagship daytime show, running from Autumn 1997 until May 1999. Replacing the long running daytime chat show Live at 3, it also replaced RTÉ One's midday show 12 to 1, merging much of the content of both shows (including presenters) into a long three-hour show which was interrupted at 4pm by Emmerdale. The series started at 15:00 and finished at 17:30.

The show was presented by Thelma Mansfield, Marty Whelan and Ciana Campbell. Derek Davis decided to leave daytime television as he was also presenting his prime-time series Davis.

Ciana Campbell also hosted a jobs show on prime-time Network 2 which was a "PM Live production". This was RTÉ's last in-house daytime production until the arrival of Today with Maura and Daithi. In 1999 the series was replaced by Open House, produced for RTÉ by Tyrone Productions.

Will be on RTE Player Christmas 2021 to mark 60 Years of Television.

References

1997 Irish television series debuts
1999 Irish television series endings
Irish television talk shows
RTÉ original programming